In Search of Lovecraft is a 2008 American horror film that was directed and written by David J. Hohl. The film stars Renee Sweet as an unfulfilled reporter that comes face to face with nightmares from early 20th-century horror writer H. P. Lovecraft's work.  It premiered at the 2008 H. P. Lovecraft Film Festival.

Plot 
The film is told through the perspective of Rebecca Marsh (Renee Sweet) a young reporter, dissatisfied with the boredom of her current occupation, who is sent to conduct a special Halloween program dedicated to H.P. Lovecraft, renowned horror writer, and worldbuilder. Rebecca's personality is initially skeptical, however, she and her assistant, Amber (Denise Amrikhas), find that their lives are in danger once they discover that the various creatures, societies, and gods featured in Lovecraft's short stories do exist, and are now actively pursuing the two of them.

Rebecca and her crew enlist the help of an expert in the occult and a witch, who assist them in fighting the forces of evil, which are revealed to be minions of the Dark God Nyarlathotep and are attempting to summon him into the real world. To defeat Nyarlathotep, Rebecca must discover the secret of The Haunter Of The Dark and obtain the Sacred Black Stone.

Cast

Reception 

HorrorNews.net gave the film a favorable review, writing "This is a nice representation of making what's due with what is on hand and not having to expense a lot of extra frills. The frills may have heightened the presentation but I think as an audience we get the gist of the direction enough to take in what is being served up. Hohl has created a decent supernatural thriller that holds up just fine in its low budget nature."

In contrast, Brutal as Hell heavily panned In Search of Lovecraft, as they felt that "If Howie were still alive, I think he’d sue the shit out of the filmmakers and possibly use the winnings to hire a hitman and have everyone involved in this travesty solidly whacked right the hell into the outer void of space and time. Word up, Hohl: try searching for Lovecraft a little harder, cuz you ain’t found him yet."

Bloody Good Horror gave the film a mixed review, contrasting the quality of the film, which they called "laughably acted and all around amateurish" against the effort put into its production, referring to it as "labors of love". The article finished by comparing the film to the then-upcoming film by Guillermo del Toro, which was also to be based on the Lovecraft mythos, "At the Mountains of Madness".

References

External links 
 

2008 films
2000s supernatural horror films
American supernatural horror films
2000s English-language films
Cthulhu Mythos films
2000s American films